There have been several Miao rebellions in Chinese history:

Miao rebellions in the Ming dynasty (14th–15th centuries)
Bozhou rebellion (1589–1600)
Miao Rebellion (1735–36)
Miao Rebellion (1795–1806)
Miao Rebellion (1854–73)

Wars involving Imperial China
Rebellions in the Ming dynasty
Rebellions in the Qing dynasty
Miao people